Dr. Nick Catalano ) is an American university educator and author. He is a professor of Literature and Music at Pace University in Pleasantville, New York.

He is director of the university's Performing Arts Music and Literature Program. In addition, he is a music columnist (Allaboutjazz.com), book reviewer (The Internet Review of Books), contributing editor to Arts&Opinion magazine,  and a writer/producer of documentaries for film and television (Greece [1990], The Hamptons [1991]).

Author
Clifford Brown: The Life and Art of the Legendary Jazz Trumpeter (Oxford University Press)
New York Nights (Auburndale 2009), a book about writing, performing and producing in New York City
A New Yorker at Sea (Aegeon Press 2012), his account of participating in an around-the-world sailing trip.
Tales of a Hamptons Sailor  (Aegeon Press 2015), stories of The Hamptons in the 80's, and a circumnavigation
Scribble from the Apple  (Aegeon Press 2019), essays on music, politics, culture, philosophy, art, and The Holocaust.

Personal
Catalano maintains residences in New York City, East Hampton NY, and Delray Beach, Florida.

References

External links
Articles Submitted to 'All About Jazz.com'
Pace University - Faculty listing

American academics of English literature
1939 births
Pace University faculty
Living people
People from Pleasantville, New York
People from East Hampton (town), New York